The Repeating Carbine Model 1890 a.k.a. Mannlicher Model 1890 Carbine is a bolt-action rifle, designed by Ferdinand Mannlicher that used a new version of his straight-pull action bolt. It was introduced as an alternative to the Mannlicher M1888 as it was shorter and easier to maneuver with. Three main versions were introduced: Cavalry Carbine, Gendarmerie Carbine and Navy Short Rifle.

Variants

Cavalry Carbine
This variant was used by the Austro-Hungarian cavalry. A stacking rod, handguard and bayonet lug are absent.

Stutzen
This variant features sling swivels on the underside, a stacking rod and bayonet lugs. It was used by the Austro-Hungarian Navy.

Gendarmerie carbine
The Austro-Hungarian Gendarmarie was also in need of a carbine. It adopted a version which featured a bayonet lug but no stacking rod.

Conversions
M90/30 was a conversion of these rifles done in the First Austrian Republic. They carry the letter S stamped on the barrel.

M90/31 was a conversion of these rifles done in the Kingdom of Hungary. They carry the letter H stamped on the barrel.

M90/95 was a conversion of these rifles done in Ethiopian Empire]. Unlike other conversions, these were done by putting existing M90 carbines in M95 pattern furniture.

Afghan Contract
A small number of these carbines made for the Afghan Contract were ordered by Abdur Rahman Khan for the Emirate of Afghanistan.

References

Further reading

Austro-Hungarian Mannlicher M1890 Short Rifles and Carbines. Hungariae.com

8×50mmR Mannlicher firearms
7.92×57mm Mauser rifles
Straight-pull rifles
Rifles of Austria
World War I Austro-Hungarian infantry weapons
Mannlicher rifles
Firearms by Ferdinand Mannlicher
Weapons and ammunition introduced in 1890